Taishi is a Chinese compound surname. Taishi literally means Grand Historian, a high official in ancient imperial China. For example, Sima Qian was the Grand Historian in Han Dynasty.

Taishi is not included in the Hundred Family Surnames book and is no longer used to this day.

Notable people named Taishi
Taishi Ci, military general of Eastern Wu

References

Chinese-language surnames
Individual Chinese surnames